Harinder Kaur Malhi  (born ) is a Canadian former politician in Ontario, Canada. She was a Liberal member of the Legislative Assembly of Ontario from 2014 to 2018 who represented the riding of Brampton—Springdale, and was a member of the Ontario provincial cabinet in the government of Kathleen Wynne.

Background
Malhi's family is of Indian descent, and she speaks Punjabi. Her father, Gurbax Singh Malhi, was a Liberal federal Member of Parliament between 1993 and 2011, representing the riding of Bramalea—Gore—Malton. Her mother is Devinder Malhi.

Malhi studied at Ryerson University, where she obtained a degree in public administration and governance. She worked as a sales agent at a telecommunications company in Brampton, and then as a real estate agent.

Politics
On 25 October 2010, she was elected as a school trustee for the Peel District School Board, representing Brampton wards 9 and 10, during the 2010 municipal election.

Malhi was selected as the Liberal candidate for the Brampton-Springdale riding after incumbent cabinet minister Linda Jeffrey vacated the seat in March 2014 to run for the mayor of Brampton. She was elected MPP in the 2014 election and took an unpaid leave of absence from her position as school trustee, during the campaign.

She served as Parliamentary Assistant to the Minister of Tourism, Culture and Sport (2016–18), and as Parliamentary Assistant to the Minister Responsible for Women's Issues (2014–16). In January 2018, she was promoted to cabinet as Minister of the Status of Women by Premier Kathleen Wynne.

In the 2018 provincial election she ran in the new riding of Brampton North, placing third, losing the seat to Kevin Yarde the NDP. In the 2022 provincial election, she contested Brampton North once again, coming in second place, but this time losing to the Progressive Conservative candidate Graham McGregor.

Cabinet positions

Elections

References

External links

1980s births
21st-century Canadian politicians
21st-century Canadian women politicians
Canadian politicians of Indian descent
Canadian real estate agents
Canadian Sikhs
Living people
Members of the Executive Council of Ontario
Ontario Liberal Party MPPs
Ontario school board trustees
Politicians from Brampton
Women MPPs in Ontario
Women government ministers of Canada